

First round selections

The following are the first round picks in the 1988 Major League Baseball draft.

Supplemental first round selections

Compensation picks

Other notable players
Arthur Rhodes†, 2nd round, 34th overall by the Baltimore Orioles
Bob Hamelin, 2nd round, 48th overall by the Kansas City Royals
Darren Oliver, 3rd round, 63rd overall by the Texas Rangers
Scott Servais, 3rd round, 64th overall by the Houston Astros
Marquis Grissom†, 3rd round, 76th overall by the Montreal Expos
David Weathers, 3rd round, 82nd overall by the Toronto Blue Jays
Luis Gonzalez†, 4th round, 90th overall by the Houston Astros
Turk Wendell, 5th round, 112th overall by the Atlanta Braves
Mickey Morandini†, 5th round, 120th overall by the Philadelphia Phillies
John Valentin, 5th round, 121st overall by the Boston Red Sox
Pat Listach, 5th round, 133rd overall by the Milwaukee Brewers
Eric Karros, 6th round, 140th overall by the Los Angeles Dodgers
Gary DiSarcina, 6th round, 143rd overall by the California Angels
Rheal Cormier, 6th round, 158th overall by the St. Louis Cardinals
Greg McMichael, 7th round, 163rd overall by the Cleveland Indians
Jim Edmonds†, 7th round, 169th overall by the California Angels
Mark Wohlers†, 8th round, 190th overall by the Atlanta Braves
Tim Naehring, 8th round, 199th overall by the Boston Red Sox
Tim Wakefield†, 8th round, 200th overall by the Pittsburgh Pirates
Mark Clark, 9th round, 236th overall by the St. Louis Cardinals
Pete Rose Jr., 12th round, 295th overall by the Baltimore Orioles
Scott Hatteberg, 12th round, 302nd overall by the Philadelphia Phillies, but did not sign
Paul Byrd†, 13th round, 332nd overall by the Cincinnati Reds, but did not sign
Kenny Lofton†, 17th round, 428th overall by the Houston Astros
Darren Lewis, 18th round, 463rd overall by the Oakland Athletics
John Flaherty, 25th round, 641st overall by the Boston Red Sox
Joey Hamilton, 28th round, 711th overall by the Baltimore Orioles, but did not sign
Woody Williams†, 28th round, 732nd overall by the Toronto Blue Jays
Russ Davis, 29th round, 755th overall by the New York Yankees
Jeff Frye, 30th round, 765th overall by the Texas Rangers
Damion Easley†, 30th round, 767th overall by the California Angels
Deion Sanders, 30th round, 781st overall by the New York Yankees
Mike Matheny, 31st round, 810th overall by the Toronto Blue Jays, but did not sign
Aaron Sele†, 37th round, 961st overall by the Minnesota Twins, but did not sign
Marvin Benard, 39th round, 1003rd overall by the Chicago White Sox, but did not sign
Orlando Palmeiro, 43rd round, 1114th overall by the New York Yankees, but did not sign
Scott Erickson†, 44th round, 1140th overall by the Toronto Blue Jays, but did not sign
Fernando Viña†, 51st round, 1266th overall by the New York Yankees, but did not sign
Mike Piazza‡, 62nd round, 1390th overall by the Los Angeles Dodgers

† All-Star  
‡ Hall of Famer

NFL players drafted
Rodney Peete, 14th round, 359th overall by the Oakland Athletics, but did not sign
Todd Marinovich, 43rd round, 1101st overall by the California Angels, but did not sign
Hart Lee Dykes, 54th round, 1300th overall by the Chicago White Sox, but did not sign

See also

List of first overall Major League Baseball draft picks

External links
Complete draft list from The Baseball Cube database

References

Major League Baseball draft
Draft
Major League Baseball draft